The 2017 Sun Belt Conference women's soccer tournament was the postseason women's soccer tournament for the Sun Belt Conference held from November 1–5, 2017. The seven-match tournament took place at the Foley Sports Complex in Foley, Alabama. The eight-team single-elimination tournament consisted of three rounds based on seeding from regular season conference play. The defending champions were the South Alabama Jaguars and they successfully defended their title with a 5–0 win over the Coastal Carolina Chanticleers in the final. This was the fifth consecutive and fifth overall Sun Belt women's soccer tournament title for South Alabama and the first for first-year head coach Richard Moodie.

Bracket

Schedule

Quarterfinals

Semifinals

Final

Statistics

Goalscorers 

4 Goals
 Rio Hardy - South Alabama

3 Goals
 Kory Dixon - South Alabama

2 Goals
 Kayla Christian - Coastal Carolina
 Ana Helmert - South Alabama
 Sarah Price - Georgia Southern

1 Goal
 Lauren Dabner - Coastal Carolina
 Kiersten Edlund - Troy
 Daniella Famili - Coastal Carolina
 Steffi Hardy - South Alabama
 Danielle Henley - South Alabama
 Kassi Hormuth - Texas State
 Mackenzie Gibbs - Coastal Carolina
 Arola Aparicio Gili - Little Rock
 Dana O'Boye - Arkansas State
 Elisabeth Rockhill - Coastal Carolina
 Aila Sendra - Georgia Southern

See also 
 2017 Sun Belt Conference Men's Soccer Tournament

References

External links 
2017 Sun Belt Soccer Championship

Sun Belt Conference Women's Soccer Tournament
2017 Sun Belt Conference women's soccer season
Women's sports in Alabama